Wilde is a surname.

Wilde may also refer to:
 Wilde (film), a film about Oscar Wilde
 Wilde, Buenos Aires, a town in Argentina
 Wilde (Eder), a tributary of the Eder in Hesse, Germany
 Wilda, Poznań or Wilde, a district of Poland
 Wilde Lake, Columbia, Maryland, a reservoir and the surrounding neighborhood
 Wilde River, a river in Massachusetts and Rhode Island

People with the given name
 Wilde Gomes da Silva (born 1981), Brazilian futsal player

See also
 De Wilde., a botanical author abbreviation for Émile Auguste Joseph De Wildeman
 Wild (disambiguation)
 Wilde Professor of Mental Philosophy, a professorship at the University of Oxford